Muitoa is a settlement in Ha'ano island, Tonga. It had a population of 53 in 2016.

References

Populated places in Tonga
Haʻapai